Ryan Christopher Thompson (born June 9, 1988) is an American professional basketball player for Hapoel Holon of the Israeli Premier League. He played college basketball for Rider University before playing professionally in the NBA D-League, Italy, Belgium, Germany, Serbia, Turkey and Israel.

College career
Thompson played four seasons of college basketball at the Rider University, with the Rider Broncs.

Professional career
Thompson went undrafted in the 2010 NBA draft.

For the 2010–11 season he played with the Utah Flash of the NBA Development League.

On July 13, 2011, he signed with Basket Brescia Leonessa of the Italian Legadue Basket for the 2011–12 season.

In July 2012, he signed with Generali Okapi Aalstar of Belgium for the 2012–13 season.

On July 15, 2013, he signed with Telenet Oostende. With Oostende he won the Belgian League and Belgian Cup in the 2013–14 season.

On July 8, 2014, he signed with Brose Baskets of Germany for the 2014–15 season.

On August 25, 2015, he signed a one-year deal with Crvena zvezda. On December 28, 2015, he parted ways with Crvena zvezda after appearing in seventeen ABA league games and ten Euroleague games. The same day he signed with Trabzonspor for the rest of the season.

On July 13, 2016, he signed with German club Telekom Baskets Bonn for the 2016–17 season.

On June 9, 2017, Thompson signed with German club ratiopharm Ulm.

On July 28, 2019, Thompson signed with Hapoel Holon of the Israeli Premier League for the 2019–20 season.

Career statistics

Euroleague

|-
| style="text-align:left;"| 2015–16
| style="text-align:left;"| Crvena zvezda
| 10 || 6 || 19.5 || .373 || .190 || .667 || 1.6 || .9 || .5 || .1 || 4.8 || 1.7
|- class="sortbottom"
| style="text-align:center;" colspan="2"| Career
| 10 || 6 || 19.5 || .373 || .190 || .667 || 1.6 || .9 || .5 || .1 || 4.8 || 1.7

Personal life
Thompson is the younger brother of former NBA player Jason Thompson.

References

External links
 Ryan Thompson at aba-liga.com
 Ryan Thompson at draftexpress.com
 Ryan Thompson at easycredit-bbl.de
 Ryan Thompson at eurobasket.com
 Ryan Thompson at euroleague.net
 Ryan Thompson at fiba.com
 

1988 births
Living people
American expatriate basketball people in Belgium
American expatriate basketball people in Germany
American expatriate basketball people in Israel
American expatriate basketball people in Italy
American expatriate basketball people in Serbia
American expatriate basketball people in Turkey
American men's basketball players
Basketball players from New Jersey
Basket Brescia Leonessa players
BC Oostende players
Brose Bamberg players
Hapoel Holon players
KK Crvena zvezda players
Lenape High School alumni
Okapi Aalstar players
People from Mount Laurel, New Jersey
Ratiopharm Ulm players
Rider Broncs men's basketball players
Sportspeople from Burlington County, New Jersey
Small forwards
Telekom Baskets Bonn players
Trabzonspor B.K. players
Utah Flash players